In Greek mythology, Rhapso (Greek: Ῥαψώ) was a nymph or a minor goddess worshipped at Athens. She is known solely from an inscription of the 4th century BCE, found at Phaleron. Her name apparently derives from the Greek verb ῥάπτω "to sew" or "to stitch". 

According to some, she is associated with the Moirai (as a fate goddess) and Eileithyia (as a birth goddess); she somehow organized a man's thread of life, at birth, by some sort of stitching work (similar to Clotho of the Moirai). And according to others, she was possibly a patroness of seamstresses.

Notes

References
 H. G. Liddel, R. Scott, H. Stuart Jones, R. McKenzie. Greek-English Lexicon. Revised supplement. Oxford, Clarendon Press, 1996; p. 269, under Ῥαψώ
 Chantraine, Pierre. Dictionnaire étymologique de la langue grecque. Histoire des mots. Tome IV-1. Paris, Éditions Klincksiek, 1977; p. 967, sous ῥάπτω (French)
 Glossalalia: an alphabet of critical keywords, by Julian Wolfreys, Harun Karim Thomas
 David Gerard Rice, John E. Stambaugh. Sources for the study of Greek religion, 2009. - pp. 114, 115

Nymphs
Sewing